Brindabella may refer to:

 Brindabella Airlines
 Brindabella Business Park, part of Canberra Airport
 Brindabella College in O'Connor, Australian Capital Territory
 Brindabella electorate
 The Brindabella Ranges
 Brindabella National Park
 Brindabella (yacht), a yacht that won the Sydney to Hobart Yacht Race in 1991 & 1997
 Brindabella Road
 Brindabella Station, the childhood home of Miles Franklin
 Brindabella Valley, the valley of the Goodradigbee River
 Brindabella, New South Wales
 Brindabellas, a housing estate in Bonython, Australian Capital Territory